Oreolalax jingdongensis (Jingdong lazy toad or Jingdong toothed toad) is a species of amphibian in the family Megophryidae. It is endemic to China: it is only found in the Ailao Mountains region in Yunnan, including the Jingdong County that has given it its name.
Its natural habitats are subtropical or tropical moist montane forests and rivers.
It is threatened by habitat loss.

References

jingdongensis
Amphibians of China
Endemic fauna of Yunnan
Taxonomy articles created by Polbot
Amphibians described in 1983